Tejano music, also known as Tex-Mex music, is a popular music style fusing Mexican and US influences. Typically, Tejano combines Mexican Spanish vocal styles with dance rhythms from Czech and German genres – particularly polka or waltz. Tejano music is traditionally played by small groups featuring accordion and guitar or bajo sexto. Its evolution began in northern Mexico (a variation known as ).

It reached a much larger audience in the late 20th-century thanks to the explosive popularity of the singer Selena ("The Queen of Tejano"), Mazz, and other performers like Ramon Ayala, La Mafia, Ram Herrera, La Sombra, Elida Reyna, Elsa García, Laura Canales, Oscar Estrada, Jay Perez, Emilio Navaira, Esteban "Steve" Jordan, Shelly Lares, David Lee Garza, Jennifer Peña and La Fiebre.

Origins
Europeans from Germany (first during the Spanish regime in the 1830s), Poland, and what is now the Czech Republic migrated to Texas and Mexico, bringing with them their style of music and dance. They brought with them the accordion, polkas music and dance. Their music influenced the Tejanos. Central to the evolution of early Tejano music was the blend of traditional forms such as the corrido and mariachi, and Continental European styles, such as polka introduced by Germany, Polish, and Czech settlers in the late 19th century. In particular, the accordion was adopted by Tejano folk musicians at the turn of the 20th century, and it became a popular instrument for amateur musicians in Texas and Northern Mexico. Small bands known as orquestas, featuring amateur musicians, became a staple at community dances. Early inceptions of Tejano music demonstrated musical innovation, but also a socially and culturally innovation in themes that countered narratives of dominant culture.

At the turn of the century, Tejanos were mostly involved in ranching and agriculture. The only diversion was the occasional traveling musician who would come to the ranches and farms. Their basic instruments were the flute, guitar, and drum, and they sang songs that were passed down through the generations from songs originally sung in Mexico. One of these musicians was Lydia Mendoza, who became one of the first to record Spanish language music as part of RCA's expansion of their popular race records of the 1920s. As these traveling musicians traveled into areas where the German Texans and other European settlers lived. 

Norteño/conjunto accordion pioneer Narciso Martínez, known as the "Father of Conjunto Music", defined the accordion's role in conjunto music. He learned many tunes from German, Polish and Czech brass bands and transposed them to accordion. Martínez gave accordion playing a new virtuosity in the 1930s, when he adopted the two button row accordion. At the same time, he formed a group with bajo sexto player Santiago Almeida.
 
With the accordion, drums, and bajo sexto, Tejanos now had a sound they could begin to call their own. In the 1940s, Valerio Longoria introduced lyrics to conjunto music, further establishing the Tejano claim to this new sound.

In the 1950s, Isidro Lopez further revolutionized the Tejano sound by emphasizing less on the traditional Spanish that Valerio used and using the new Tex-Mex instead. This created a newer sound and took us one step close to the sound we have today. In the 1960s and 70s Little Joe and The Latinaires (later renamed La Familia), The Latin Breed, Luis Ramirez Y su Latin Express, and others infused the orchestra sound into the Tejano sound, taking their influences from Pop, R&B, and other forms of music. In the late 70s and early 80s, there was a new sound emerging with up-and-coming groups like McAllen's Espejismo, led by songwriter/lead singer Rudy Valdez, and Brownsville natives Joe Lopez, Jimmy Gonzalez, and Mazz introduced keyboard to Tejano, influenced by the disco sound of the era. During that period, La Mafia became the first Tejano band to put on rock-style shows for their generation.

History 
Tejano musicians like Flaco Jiménez and Esteban Steve Jordan carried on Martinez's tradition of accordion virtuosity and became a fixture on the international World Music scene by the 1980s.

In the 1950s and 1960s, rock and roll and country music made inroads, and electric guitars and drums were added to conjunto combos. Also, performers such as Little Joe added both nuances of soul music and R&B, and a Chicano political consciousness. Little Joe, Estevan Jordan, The Royal Jesters, Romances, Carlos Guzman, Joe Bravo, Dimas Three, Chuck & the Dots, the Sky Tones, the Broken Hearts, the Volumes and Sunny Ozuna and the Sunliners were popular in 1960s.

The 1960s and 1970s brought a new chicano music and the first La Onda Tejana Broadcasters. Popular Tejano musician and producer Paulino Bernal of the Conjunto Bernal discovered and introduced to the Tejano music scene the norteño band Los Relampagos del Norte with Ramón Ayala and Cornelio Reyna on his Bego Records. Ayala still enjoys success on both sides of the border. Reyna enjoyed a very successful career as an actor and solo singer and resurfaced in the Tejano scene with a major hit with his collaboration with Tejano band La Mafia. He toured constantly until his death. In the 1960s and 1970s, the first La Onda Tejana broadcasting pioneers hit the airwaves including Marcelo Tafoya (first recipient of the Tejano Music Awards "Lifetime Achievement Award), Ramiro "Snowball" de la Cruz, Mary Rodriguez, Rosita Ornelas, and Luis Gonzalez, shortly followed by an influx of broadcasters including the Davila family of San Antonio. This central Texas support by popular broadcasters helped fuel La Onda.

In 1987, Gloria Anzaldúa wrote: 

La Onda popularity continued to surge in the early to mid-1980s with the fusion progression of Tejano music coming to the forefront regionally with Tejano ballads like Espejismo's hit "Somos Los Dos", written and sung by McAllen native Rudy Valdez, and La Sombra with their Tex-Mex English and Spanish brand of Tejano. As the 1990s dawned, La Mafia, already holding over a dozen Tejano Music Awards, originated a new Tejano style later to become a Tejano standard. With extensive touring from as early as 1988, they eventually opened the doors for such artists as Selena Quintanilla, Emilio Navaira, Jay Perez, and Mazz. Electronic instruments and synthesizers increasingly dominated the sound, and Tejano music increasingly appealed to bilingual country and rock fans. In the wake of her murder, Selena Quintanilla's music received attention from a mainstream American audience as well. Quintanilla, known as "The Queen of Tejano Music", became the first female Tejano artist to win a Grammy and her Ven Conmigo became the first Tejano album by a female artist to be certified gold.

Since the end of the 20th century, Tejano has seen a decline of dedicated radio stations across the US, due to several factors. Among these is the success of Intocable. As a result, many radio stations across the U.S., especially in Texas, have converted to Norteño/banda. This has caused Tejano internet radio to become popular.

At the turn of the 21st century, Tejano influence has declined in part due to decreased promotion, the rise in Regional Mexican and other Latin music, the breakup or retirement of established performers, and the emergence of few new performers. Most Tejano artists who performed throughout the 1990s during the music's peak who are still performing today have rarely played to the same wide attention in recent years. Regardless, today's Tejano music, while far more pop-oriented than its Depression-era roots, is still a regional musical style in several Tejano communities as well as in other parts of the United States.

Development

Tejano music was born in Texas. Although it has influences from Mexico and other Latin American countries, the main influences are American. The types of music that make up Tejano are folk music, roots music, rock, R&B, soul music, blues, country music and the Latin influences of norteño, mariachi, and Mexican cumbia. Tejano musicians such as Emilio and Raulito Navaira, David Lee Garza, and Jay Perez exhibit influence from rock and roots music.

Tejano has various categories of music and bands. Three major categories are conjunto, orchestra/orquesta, and modern. A conjunto band is composed of accordion, bajo sexto, electric bass, and drums. Examples of conjunto bands are Esteban "Steve" Jordan, and The Hometown Boys. An orchestra/orquesta consists of bass, drums, electric guitar, synthesizer, and a brass section on which it relies heavily for its sound.  Some examples of Modern bands are Ruben Ramos and the Texas Revolution, The Liberty Band, The Latin Breed, La Mafia, Selena Quintanilla, La Sombra, Elida Reyna y Avante, Los Palominos, David Lee Garza y Los Musicales, Shelly Lares, Jay Perez, and Mazz.

There has been an increasing Mexican influence on Tejano music resulting in a sound more like Norteño. The accordion, while a historically popular instrument in Tejano music, has gone from a secondary instrument to a must-have instrument. Today, groups like Sunny Sauceda, Eddie Gonzalez, and La Tropa F emphasize the accordion.

Music industry 
During the Post World War II years, local and regional companies emerged to record and market Tejano music. Key factors that influenced the production of Tejano music can be attributed to a diversifying American culture and greater socioeconomic opportunities enabled Mexican American musicians to perform and record music for regional audiences. Early popular forms of Tejano music in the form of female duets and orquesta tejana  of the 1940s later influenced the development of Tex-Mex style of the 1950s, and La Onda Chicana (The Chicano Wave) of the 1960s. The growing popularity of accordion based music and "homegrown" records directly influenced the need for Tejano record producers and labels.

Record companies such as Discos Ideal established in San Benito, Texas in 1947 and Freddie Records established in Corpus Christi, Texas in 1970 are among the most prolific in producing conjunto style music. Freddie Records, named after founder, Freddie Martinez, Sr. has remained a key figure in the production of Tejano music well into the 21st century.

Influence
The term "Tex-Mex" is also used in American rock and roll for Tejano-influenced performers such as the Sir Douglas Quintet and the Texas Tornados (featuring Flaco Jiménez, Freddy Fender, Augie Meyers, and Doug Sahm), Los Super Seven, Sam the Sham and the Pharaohs, Los Lobos, Latin Playboys, Louie and the Lovers, The Champs, Ry Cooder, Calexico, Los Lonely Boys, The Mavericks, Son de Rey, and Selena y Los Dinos.

Texan accordion music has also influenced Basque trikitixa players.

Contemporary Swedish-American composer Sven-David Sandström has incorporated Tejano stylings in his classical music.

Tejano and conjunto music is so popular that organizations such as the Guadalupe Arts Center in San Antonio, Texas hold annual festivals every year. The performers have included legends such as Flaco Jimenez, conjunto groups from around the world, and contemporary artists.

Tejano music female singers of the late 1980s and 1990s 
The unknown history of many Tejano female singers in the late 1980s and 1990s has remained in the dark because of little to no media exposure; perhaps, the media was fixated on the biggest names like Selena, Laura Canales, Elsa García (singer), Elida Reyna, Shelly Lares and a few others. They were famous and well promoted for good reason - they had notable vocal talent, great producers, top class musicians (bands), and recording studios that rushed to give them the publicity they needed. Tejano female singers Lynda V (and the Boys) and Letty Guval are two amongst others who made their mark in Tejano Music in 1990s but little is known about them. Lynda V (and the Boys) formed her band in 1988, signed a record contract with Bob Griever and CBS Records in 1990, and two years later signed a record deal with major company Capitol EMI. Lynda V and the Boys worked together as a band until 2005. Letty Guval started her Tejano music career in 1994 after singing with the University of Texas Pan American Mariachi Band in Edinburg for two years. She signed a record contract with Wicker Records in 1994 and signed a four-year contract with Fonovisa-Platino Records; her career was short-lived, but she was the first female Tejano artist to be invited to sing at the White House during the Clinton administration in 1994. In her News article, Kelly James from the South Bend Tribune writes about Letty, "Born in California, raised in Mexico, and educated in Texas, Guval incorporates her cross-cultural experience into her music." In his book, Guadalupe San Miguel, Jr. writes about both, Letty Guval and Lynda V, he writes, "EMI Latin … had five relatively new female acts: Stephanie Lynn, Elsa García, Lynda V. and the Boys, Agnes Torres of the New Variety Band, and Delia y Culturas".  About Letty Guval San Miguel says, "Occasionally, Tejano musicians provided only touches of music from other styles, their incorporation into Tejano music was brief enough so that it did not interrupt the beat of the song. Two examples come to mind—one from Letty Guval and the second from Conjunto Bernal. In the mid-1990s, Guval, a popular Tejana performer, recorded a ranchera called 'Sentimiento.' At key points in the song and for only a few seconds, she incorporated some banda rhythms." Both Lynda V. and Letty Guval traveled the United States and Mexico performing for many. In the 1990s both performed different times at the Tejano Music Awards and the Johnny Canales Show.

See also
Latin music
Chicano rock
Chicano rap
Music of Texas
Carlos Santana
Tejano Music Awards
Chulas Fronteras (1976 film)
Latin American music
Latin Grammy Award for Best Tejano Album

References

Further reading
Listening to Rosita: The Business of Tejana Music and Culture, 1930–1955 by Mary Ann Villarreal, 2015, University of Oklahoma Press

External links

Tejano Music News

 
Regional styles of Mexican music
Hispanic American music
Hispanic and Latino American culture in Texas
American styles of music
Mexican-American culture in Texas
Mexican styles of music
Music of Texas
Czech-American culture in Texas
German-American culture in Texas
Polish-American culture in Texas
1980s in Latin music
1990s in Latin music
Catholic music